Muhammad Haziq Kasyful Azim bin Mohammad Hasimulabdillah (born 24 December 1998) is a Bruneian footballer who plays as a defender or midfielder for Kasuka FC of the Brunei Super League and the Brunei national football team.

Club career
From 2013 to 2016, Haziq trained with Tabuan Muda, the youth scheme of the National Football Association of Brunei Darussalam, while playing for their league teams in the 2015 Brunei Premier League and the 2016 Brunei Super League consecutively. He moved to Menglait FC in the 2017–18 Brunei Super League season, finishing in tenth place out of 11, ending in relegation. He played for Kasuka FC at the start of the following season.

At the start of 2019, Haziq was one of 24 youth players unveiled as the squad members for the return of DPMM FC to the Bruneian leagues, starting from the 2018–19 Brunei Premier League. He scored on his debut in a 4–0 win over Rimba Star FC on 9 January. The team comfortably won the league and gained promotion to the 2020 Brunei Super League which was eventually expanded to 16 teams. Unfortunately, the league was abandoned after only two rounds played due to the COVID-19 pandemic.

The following year, DPMM FC played their first team for the 2021 Brunei Super League and hence Haziq returned to Kasuka FC, where they were unbeaten after five matches until a 2–0 defeat to Haziq's former employers DPMM ended their streak in the beginning of August. Soon after another streak was broken with the presence of local COVID-19 infections, forcing the league to be abandoned for a second time.

In 2022, Haziq managed to go all the way to the final of the 2022 Brunei FA Cup with Kasuka where they were beaten 2–1 by DPMM FC.

International career
Haziq was selected for the Brunei under-19s for the 2015 AFF U-19 Youth Championship in August 2015. He was involved in all four fixtures but the team finished without a single point in their group.

Two years later, Haziq was in the Brunei under-23 squad for both the 2018 AFC U-23 Championship qualification matches in July 2017 and the 29th SEA Games the following month. He was ever-present for all 3 of the AFC qualifying tournament that was held in Myanmar where Brunei failed to advance. At the SEA Games, Haziq played in four out of five matches, sitting out the final match against Singapore. The Young Wasps ended the campaign without a single point gained.

Haziq was selected for the Brunei under-21 team that will play as hosts of the 2018 Hassanal Bolkiah Trophy starting in April under Spanish coach Mario Rivera. Despite winning 1–0 against Thailand, the team were knocked out in the group stage due to defeats to eventual winners Timor-Leste as well as Myanmar.

Haziq returned to the Under-23s for the 2020 AFC U-23 Championship qualification matches held in Vietnam in March 2019, then the 30th SEA Games in the Philippines from November to December 2019. Likewise of his involvement two years before, he played in all of the AFC qualifying games and also the SEA Games matches bar one. Unfortunately the Bruneian team also showed similar results to the ones they had two years ago too.

Haziq was called up by new national head coach Rivera for the full national team for the tri-nation tournament held in Bandar Seri Begawan in September 2022. He made his international debut as a starter against the Maldives in a 0–3 defeat on 21 September. Six days later, he came on as a substitute for Abdul Azizi Ali Rahman in a 1–0 win over Laos national football team at the Track & Field Sports Complex. The following month, he came on for Abdul Azizi in the second half of a 6–2 victory against Timor-Leste in the first leg of the 2022 AFF Mitsubishi Electric Cup qualifying at home. He started the second match in a 1–0 loss but Brunei advanced to the group stages of the Cup 6–3 on aggregate. Haziq subsequently played in all four of the games including starts against Thailand and Cambodia, unfortunately Brunei failed to gain a single point in the whole tournament.

Personal life
Haziq has a younger brother named Wafiq Danish who is a Bruneian youth international.

Honours
DPMM FC
 Brunei Premier League: 2018–19

References

External links

1998 births
Living people
Association football defenders
Bruneian footballers
Brunei international footballers
DPMM FC players
Competitors at the 2017 Southeast Asian Games
Competitors at the 2019 Southeast Asian Games